Parul Chauhan Thakkar is an Indian television actress. She is known for her portrayal as Ragini Sharma in Sapna Babul Ka...Bidaai and Swarna Goenka in Yeh Rishta Kya Kehlata Hai. Before venturing into acting, she did modelling. In 2009, she participated as a contestant in the reality series Jhalak Dikhhla Jaa 3.

Career
Chauhan started her career playing the lead role of Ragini Ranvir Rajvansh in the show Sapna Babul Ka...Bidaai from 2007 to 2010. In 2009, Parul then participated in Jhalak Dikhhla Jaa Season 3.

In 2010, she replaced Shalini Chandran as the lead in the television series Rishton Se Badi Pratha. She was seen in shows like Punar Vivah - Ek Nayi Umeed, Meri Aashiqui Tumse Hi. From 2016 to 2019, Chauhan played a pivotal role of Suvarna Goenka, the lead character's mother-in-law in Yeh Rishta Kya Kehlata Hai.

Television

Personal life 
Chauhan hails from Lakhimpur in Uttar Pradesh. On 12 December 2018, Chauhan married Chirag Thakkar.

Awards

References

External links
 

Living people
People from Lakhimpur Kheri
Indian soap opera actresses
Year of birth missing (living people)